The 1864 Massachusetts gubernatorial election was held on November 8.

Governor John Albion Andrew was re-elected to a fifth term in office over Democrat Henry W. Paine.

General election

Candidates
John Albion Andrew, Governor of Massachusetts since 1861 (Republican)
Henry W. Paine (Democratic)

Results

See also
 1864 Massachusetts legislature

References

Governor
1864
Massachusetts
November 1864 events